The year 1538 in science and technology included a number of events, some of which are listed here.

Botany
 William Turner's Libellus de re herbaria novus, the first essay on scientific botany in English, is published in London.

Earth sciences
 September 29–October 6 – The last significant volcanic eruption in the Phlegraean Fields of Italy creates Monte Nuovo.

Births
 March 25 – Christopher Clavius, German mathematician and astronomer (died 1612)
 Matthias de l'Obel, Flemish-born physician and botanist (died 1616)

Deaths
 May 27 – Sir Anthony Fitzherbert, English judge and agriculturalist (born 1470)
 Federico Crisogono, Italian scientist (born 1472)

 
16th century in science
1530s in science